Diana L. Kormos-Buchwald (born Diana L. Kormos) is a historian of modern physical science and the Robert M. Abbey Professor of History at the California Institute of Technology (Caltech).

Kormos-Buchwald is the General Editor and Director of the Einstein Papers Project. Volumes 7, 9, 10, 11, 12, 13, 14, and 15 of The Collected Papers of Albert Einstein have been published during her tenure at the project. She was a member at the Institute for Advanced Study in Princeton, New Jersey from 1992 to 1993 as well as the Internationales Forschungszentrum Kulturwissenschaften at Vienna in 1997. She was recently a visiting scholar at the University of Amsterdam and Boerhaave Museum in Leiden and at the Max Planck Institute for the History of Science in Berlin. She is a Fellow of the American Physical Society and the American Association for the Advancement of Science. In 2021 she was elected to the American Philosophical Society.

Kormos-Buchwald's husband Jed Buchwald is the Doris and Henry Dreyfuss Professor of History at Caltech. Her son Ady Barkan is an American activist and attorney.

Education 
Kormos-Buchwald received her bachelor's degree from Technion-Israel Institute of Technology in 1981, and her master's degree from Tel Aviv University in 1983. She received an A.M. from Harvard University in 1985 and a Ph.D. from Harvard in 1990. At Caltech, Kormos-Buchwald was Instructor from 1989 to 1990, Assistant Professor from 1990 to 1996, Associate Professor from 1996 to 2005, and Professor from 2005 to 2017. Kormos-Buchwald was appointed Robert M. Abbey Professor of History at Caltech in 2018.

Publications (selection) 
 A. Einstein; D. Kormos-Buchwald et al., eds., The Collected Papers of Albert Einstein, Vol. 15, The Berlin Years: Writings & Correspondence, June 1925 - May 1927, Princeton University Press 2018, 
 A. Einstein; D. Kormos-Buchwald et al., eds., The Collected Papers of Albert Einstein, Vol. 14, The Berlin Years: Writings & Correspondence, April 1923 - May 1925, Princeton University Press 2015, 
 A. Einstein; D. Kormos-Buchwald et al., eds., The Collected Papers of Albert Einstein, Vol. 13, The Berlin Years: Writings & Correspondence, January 1922 - March 1923, Princeton University Press 2012, 
 D. Kormos-Buchwald, Walther Nernst and the Transition to Modern Physical Sciences, paperback edition, Cambridge University Press 2011, 
 A. Einstein; D. Kormos-Buchwald et al., eds., The Collected Papers of Albert Einstein, Vol. 12, The Berlin Years: Correspondence, January - December 1921, Princeton University Press 2009, 
 A. Einstein; D. Kormos-Buchwald et al., eds., The Collected Papers of Albert Einstein, Vol. 11, Cumulative Index, Bibliography etc. to Volumes 1-10, Princeton University Press 2009, 
 A. Einstein; D. Kormos-Buchwald et al., eds., The Collected Papers of Albert Einstein, Vol. 10, Correspondence May- December 1920 and Supplementary Correspondence 1909-1920, Princeton University Press 2006, 
 A. Einstein; D. Kormos-Buchwald et al., eds., The Collected Papers of Albert Einstein, Vol. 9, Correspondence January 1919 - April 1920, Princeton University Press 2004, 
 A. Einstein; M. Janssen et al., eds., The Collected Papers of Albert Einstein, Vol. 7, Writings 1918-1921, Princeton University Press 2002, .
 D. Kormos-Buchwald, Walther Nernst and the Transition to Modern Physical Sciences, Cambridge University Press 1999,

See also 
 Einstein Papers Project
 California Institute of Technology
 Jed Buchwald
 Ady Barkan

References

External links 
 Homepage.

Technion – Israel Institute of Technology alumni
Tel Aviv University alumni
California Institute of Technology faculty
Harvard University alumni
Living people
Date of birth missing (living people)
Year of birth missing (living people)
Members of the American Philosophical Society